Yalongwan railway station,, is a railway station on the Hainan eastern ring high-speed railway, serving the Yalong Bay, located in Tiandu town, Jiyang District, Sanya City, Hainan, China.

External links

Railway stations in Hainan